Center Star, also known as Centre Star, or Centre (before the American Civil War), is an unincorporated community in Lauderdale County, in the U.S. state of Alabama.  The Center Star Neighborhood Park is an incorporated entity on file with the Lauderdale County Courthouse which holds a land trust of approximately 4 Acres of park land, adjacent to the Center Star Volunteer Fire Department.

History
Center Star is one of the oldest communities in Lauderdale County. The area was among lands claimed by both the Chickasaw and Cherokee. On May 26, 1861, Edward A. O'Neal organized the "Calhoun Guards" (which became Company I of the 9th Regiment Alabama Infantry) in Center Star. On May 9, 1864, Colonel William A. Johnson's 4th Alabama Cavalry fought with the 7th Illinois Volunteer Infantry Regiment and the 9th Ohio Infantry under the command of Colonel Richard Rowett. The earliest Methodist congregation in Lauderdale County was organized near Center Star in June 1818.

A post office was established at Center Star on April 15, 1850, and was named for its central location on the "star route" (a remote postal route served by a private contractor). The post office was in operation until 1902. It was then reopened for one year in 1914.

Demographics

Center Star was listed on the 1880 U.S. Census as an unincorporated community with a population of 69. It was the only time it was listed on the census rolls.

Notable person
 Spooner Oldham, songwriter and session musician

References

Unincorporated communities in Lauderdale County, Alabama
Unincorporated communities in Alabama